George Paice may refer to:

 George Paice (bowls) (born 1941), New Zealand-based Falkland Islands lawn bowler
 George Paice (painter) (1854–1925), British landscape, canine, hunting, and equestrian painter